Guy Standing may refer to:

 Guy Standing (actor) (1873–1937), English actor
 Guy Standing (economist) (born 1948), British professor and economist